Gomphidia is a genus of dragonfly in the family Gomphidae. It contains the following species:

Gomphidia abbotti 
Gomphidia aberrans 
Gomphidia balii 
Gomphidia bredoi 
Gomphidia caesarea 
Gomphidia confluens 
Gomphidia flechteri 
Gomphidia gamblesi 
Gomphidia ganeshi 
Gomphidia interruptstria 
Gomphidia javanica 
Gomphidia kelloggi  - Chinese Tiger
Gomphidia kirschii 
Gomphidia kodaguensis 
Gomphidia kruegeri 
Gomphidia leonorae 
Gomphidia maclachlani 
Gomphidia madi 
Gomphidia pearsoni  - Rivulet Tiger
Gomphidia platyceps 
Gomphidia quarrei  - Quarre's Tiger, Quarre's Fingertail
Gomphidia sjostedti 
Gomphidia t-nigrum 
Gomphidia williamsoni

References

Gomphidae
Anisoptera genera
Taxa named by Edmond de Sélys Longchamps
Taxonomy articles created by Polbot